Didik Ariyanto (born 12 July 1991) is an Indonesian professional footballer who plays as a left-back for Liga 2 club PSMS Medan.

Club career

Arema
He was signed for Arema to play in Liga 1 in the 2021 season. Didik made his first-team debut on 5 January 2022 as a substitute in a match against Persikabo 1973.

PSMS Medan
Didik was signed for PSMS Medan to play in Liga 2 in the 2022–23 season. He made his league debut on 30 August 2022 in a match against PSKC Cimahi at the Si Jalak Harupat Stadium, Soreang.

References

External links
 Didik Ariyanto at Soccerway
 Didik Ariyanto at Liga Indonesia

1991 births
Living people
Indonesian footballers
Persewangi Banyuwangi players
Bandung United F.C. players
Perserang Serang players
PSCS Cilacap players
Arema F.C. players
PSMS Medan players
Liga 2 (Indonesia) players
Liga 1 (Indonesia) players
Association football fullbacks
People from Surabaya
Sportspeople from East Java